Marcin Kitz (1891–1943) was a Polish-Jewish painter.

Marcin Kitz started his painting studies in Lwów at Stanisław Rejchan and Stanisław Batowski Kaczor, 
1919/1920 at Jan Matejko Academy of Fine Arts in Kraków, he studied also in Berlin, Munich and Vienna. Since 1923 he participated on the painting salons in Kraków, Lwów, Poznań and Warsaw. 1939-1941 he lived in Moscow, Kharkiv and Kiev.

He painted landscapes, still-life and genre images and portraits.

In 1943 was arrested and murdered by Gestapo during the German occupation of Lwów because he helped to give concealment to the Jews.

References

External links 

 Kitz's works in Central Jewish Library

1891 births
1943 deaths
Polish Impressionist painters
20th-century Polish painters
20th-century Polish male artists
Polish people who rescued Jews during the Holocaust
Polish Jews who died in the Holocaust
Polish male painters